James William Paterson (born 21 November 1987) is an Australian politician who has been a Senator for Victoria since 2016, representing the Liberal Party. He was appointed to Peter Dutton's shadow ministry following the Coalition's defeat at the 2022 federal election.

Early life
Paterson was born in Melbourne on 21 November 1987. He attended what he described as a "hippie" school in Melbourne's outer suburbs, and also briefly attended an elementary school in Washington, D.C., while his mother undertook an academic exchange. He completed high school at McKinnon Secondary College.

Paterson completed the degrees of Bachelor of Arts and Bachelor of Commerce at the University of Melbourne. He briefly as a special adviser to Senator Mitch Fifield and for several months as an intern for U.S. congressman Lincoln Díaz-Balart. He then worked as a writer for the Victorian Employers' Chamber of Commerce and Industry (VECCI) before joining the Institute of Public Affairs (IPA) as editor of the IPA Review publication. In the IPA, Paterson was promoted to director of communications and development, before being promoted to deputy executive director in September 2014.

Politics
Paterson joined the Liberal Party at the age of 17, despite coming from "a Labor or Greens-voting family of long-time trade union members". He was heavily involved in student politics as vice-president of the Melbourne University Liberal Club (2008–2009), vice-president of the Australian Liberal Students' Federation (2008–2009), and state president of the Young Liberals (2009).

In March 2016, the Victorian division of the Liberal Party of Australia nominated Paterson to fill the casual vacancy in the Senate caused by the resignation of Michael Ronaldson. Paterson was appointed by a joint sitting of the Parliament of Victoria on 9 March 2016.

Paterson and fellow MP Andrew Hastie were denied entry into China for a study tour in November 2019. Some believe this is due to criticism the pair has raised about Chinese actions towards the Uighurs in Xinjiang province as well as attempted influencing of opinion about China within Australia. In 2022, Paterson travelled to Washington as the new Australian Co-Chair for the Inter-Parliamentary Alliance on China in 2022; the grouping works to ensure an ascendant Communist China Chinese does not shape the decisions and values of the world's democracies.

In 2021, Paterson was elected Chair of the Parliamentary Joint Committee on Intelligence and Security following Andrew Hastie's appointment as Assistant Minister for Defence. 

In 2022, Paterson was appointed the Shadow Minister for Cyber Security and the Shadow Minister for Countering Foreign Interference by Opposition Leader Peter Dutton.

Views
Coming from the IPA where he was a fellow, Paterson has been associated with Libertarian elements of Liberal Party, who put a strong emphasis on freedom of speech as well as free markets. He has sought reform to section 18C of the Racial Vilification Act 1996 to remove elements that may restrict free speech. Some have grouped him with the national right faction of the Liberal Party. 

On global matters, Paterson has been an advocate for human rights of religious and ethnic minority groups and a strong critic of Communist China. Paterson expressed his support of Brexit, and a freedom of movement deal between Canada, Australia, New Zealand and the United Kingdom (CANZUK).

In August 2017, Paterson described himself as a supporter of same-sex marriage, and during the Australian Marriage Law Postal Survey he drafted a same-sex marriage bill as an alternative to one proposed by Senator Dean Smith. He later backed down from putting up a bill.

Personal life
Paterson met his wife Lydia at a Liberal student function. The couple had two children as of 2021.

Paterson is an agnostic and has described himself as "not religious at all", although his wife is Catholic and his children were baptised as Catholics.

References

External links
Parliamentary biography
 Summary of parliamentary voting for Senator James Paterson on TheyVoteForYou.org.au

1987 births
Living people
Liberal Party of Australia members of the Parliament of Australia
Members of the Australian Senate
Members of the Australian Senate for Victoria
University of Melbourne alumni
21st-century Australian politicians
Australian monarchists